is the name of famous Buddhist temple　and city in Japan. Below is an incomplete list:

Temple - Zentsū-ji. It is an origin of the following city name.
City - Zentsūji, Kagawa